Don't Waste It is the debut studio album by Australian band Jo Jo Zep & The Falcons. Released in February 1977, the album peaked at number 37 on the Australian Kent Music Report.

Band member Joe Camilleri later reflected saying "The first Jo Jo Zep & The Falcons album was a heart-breaking experience. We had so much energy live, but I didn’t know how to capture that in the studio."

Track listing

Personnel
Jo Jo Zep & the Falcons
Joe Camilleri — tenor and alto saxophones, vocals; lead vocals (tracks 1, 3-6, 10)
Jeff Burstin — lead guitar
Wayne Burt — rhythm guitar, vocals; lead vocals (tracks 2, 7, 9)
John Power — bass, vocals; lead vocals (track 8)
Gary Young — drums
Additional personnel
Ross Wilson — percussion, backing vocals
Adrian Paine — percussion
Peter Jones — vibraphone
Pat Wilson — backing vocals (track 9)

Charts

References 

1977 debut albums
Jo Jo Zep & The Falcons albums